Feldatal is a municipality in the Vogelsbergkreis in Hesse, Germany.

Geography

Location
The community lies 285 to 598 m above sea level on the north slope of the Vogelsberg mountains. Through the community flows the river Felda, which empties into the Ohm at Gemünden.

Neighbouring communities
Feldatal borders in the north on the town of Romrod, in the northeast on the community of Schwalmtal, in the east on the community of Lautertal, in the south on the town of Ulrichstein, in the southwest on the community of Mücke, and in the northwest on the community of Gemünden.

Constituent communities
The community consists of the centres of Ermenrod, Groß-Felda with constituent community of Schellnhausen, Kestrich, Köddingen, Stumpertenrod, Windhausen and Zeilbach.

History

Amalgamations
Feldatal came into being as a result of the municipal reforms in 1972 when the aforesaid constituent communities were united into a greater community.

Politics

The municipal council is made up of 15 members. As of the municipal elections held on 26 March 2006, 4 seats are held by the SPD, 4 by the CDU, 6 by the FWG, a citizens' coalition, and one by the A.L.F.

The municipal executive is made up of 7 members and the mayor. Two seats are held by the SPD, 2 by the CDU, 2 by the FWG, and one by the A.L.F.

The current mayor, Leopold Bach, was elected in 2018.

Coat of arms
Feldatal's civic coat of arms might heraldically be described thus: Or a virgin-headed spreadeagle gules crowned azure, therein an inescutcheon argent a hammer and four nails azure.

The inescutcheon (smaller inner shield, called a Herzschild or "heartshield" in German heraldry) refers to the dominant handicraft in the community, namely nailsmithing. This trade was practised even into the early 20th century. The virgin-headed spreadeagle (Jungfrauenadler) has its roots in Feldatal's mediaeval noble family's arms.

Culture and sightseeing

Buildings
 Hesse's biggest timber-framed church, built in 1696 (in Stumpertenrod)
 Zeilbach Church, built in 1668 – shake roof
 Kestrich Church, half-timbered, and right next door the former synagogue and Jewish school (in Kestrich)
 Jewish cemetery (in Kestrich)
 Still working mills, for instance Wolfenmühle in Groß-Felda, Burgsmühle in Zeilbach and Herrenmühle in Ermenrod.

Regular events
 Feldataler Mühlenfest ("mill festival")- Stumpertenrod
 Ostermarkt (Easter Market)- Gross Felda
 Weihnachtsmarkt (Christmas Market)
 Goldwing Meeting in Groß-Felda (every two years)
 Schmiedefest (Blacksmith festival)

Economy and infrastructure

Transport
Through the community runs the Federal Highway (Bundesstraße) B 49.

References

External links
  
 Feldatal-Windhausen

Vogelsbergkreis
Grand Duchy of Hesse